Fred Hawkins (September 3, 1923 – December 6, 2014) was an American professional golfer who played on the PGA Tour from the mid-1940s to the mid-1960s.

Hawkins was born in Antioch, Illinois. He attended the University of Illinois and the Texas State School of Mines and Metallurgy (now University of Texas at El Paso). He turned professional in 1947. He won once and had 19 runner-up finishes in PGA Tour events. His best year in professional golf was 1956, when he finished fourth on the money list plus notched his one and only PGA Tour win at the Oklahoma City Open. His best finish in a major was a second-place tie (with Doug Ford) in the 1958 Masters Tournament won by Arnold Palmer. Hawkins also had a T-6 at the 1957 U.S. Open. He played on the 1957 Ryder Cup team.

Hawkins played on the Senior PGA Tour (now Champions Tour) from 1980 to 1991. His best finishes were two T-3s in the 1983 Merrill Lynch/Golf Digest Commemorative Pro-Am and the 1984 Gatlin Brothers Seniors Golf Classic.

Hawkins lived in El Paso, Texas during much of his career, and lived in Sebring, Florida until his death in 2014.

Professional wins (3)

PGA Tour wins (1)

PGA Tour playoff record (0–1)

Other wins (2)
1950 Cavalier Specialists Invitational
1961 New Mexico Open

Results in major championships

Note: Hawkins never played in The Open Championship.

CUT = missed the half-way cut (3rd round cut in 1962 PGA Championship)
R128, R64, R32, R16, QF, SF = Round in which player lost in PGA Championship match play
"T" indicates a tie for a place

Summary

Most consecutive cuts made – 10 (1956 PGA – 1960 Masters)
Longest streak of top-10s – 2 (1951 U.S. Open – 1952 Masters)

U.S. national team appearances
Ryder Cup: 1957

References

External links

American male golfers
PGA Tour golfers
PGA Tour Champions golfers
Ryder Cup competitors for the United States
Golfers from Illinois
Golfers from Florida
University of Illinois Urbana-Champaign alumni
University of Texas at El Paso alumni
People from Antioch, Illinois
Sportspeople from El Paso, Texas
People from Sebring, Florida
1923 births
2014 deaths